This is a list of ship classes used by the Royal Navy during The Cold War.

Aircraft Carriers

Fleet carriers 

 Illustrious-class aircraft carrier-WWII era HMS Victorious (R38) modernised in 1950s and in commission till 1968. 
 Implacable-class aircraft carrier-WWII era decommissioned in mid 1950s. 
 Audacious-class aircraft carrier-  Served from 1951 till 1979.

Light Carriers 

 1942 Design Light Fleet Carrier- WWII era served till early 1960s.
 Centaur-class aircraft carrier- In service 1953 to 1984. 
 Invincible-class aircraft carrier- In service from 1980 till 2014.

Battleships 

 HMS Vanguard (23)-Last British battleship ever built. Served from 1946 to 1960.

Crusiers 

 Tiger-class cruiser-Last British Crusier class. Served from 1959 to 1979.

Destroyers 
 Daring-class destroyer (1949)-Last RN primarily gun armed destroyers
 County-class destroyer-First RN Guided-missile destroyers
 Type 42 destroyer-In service 1975 to 2013
 HMS Bristol (D23)- Served from 1973 to 1991.

Frigates 

 Whitby-class frigate
 Rothesay-class frigate
 Leander-class frigate
 Blackwood-class frigate
 Leopard-class frigate
 Salisbury-class frigate
 Tribal-class frigate
 Type 21 frigate
 Type 22 frigate

Corvettes 

 Peacock-class corvette

Submarines

Ballistic missile submarines 

 Resolution-class submarine

Attack submarines 

 HMS Dreadnought (S101)
Valiant-class submarine
 Churchill-class submarine
 Swiftsure-class submarine
 Trafalgar-class submarine

Amphibious warfare ships 

 Fearless-class landing platform dock

Mine countermeasures vessels 

 Hunt-class mine countermeasures vessel

Patrol boats 

 Dark-class patrol boat
 Brave-class patrol boat
 Island-class patrol vessel
 Castle-class patrol vessel
Archer-class patrol vessel

References

Lists of Royal Navy ships